Valentin Dochev Getsov (born 14 March 1967 in Ruse, Bulgaria) is a Bulgarian former wrestler who competed in the 1992 Summer Olympics.

References

External links
 

1967 births
Living people
Olympic wrestlers of Bulgaria
Wrestlers at the 1992 Summer Olympics
Bulgarian male sport wrestlers
Olympic silver medalists for Bulgaria
Olympic medalists in wrestling
Sportspeople from Ruse, Bulgaria
Medalists at the 1992 Summer Olympics
20th-century Bulgarian people
21st-century Bulgarian people